Frances Hyland (born Frances C. Moore) was an American screenwriter active between the late 1920s and the late 1940s. She was the first woman hired as a "gagman" at a film studio, and she wrote dozens of comedic scripts over the course of her career.

Biography 
Hyland was born in Arkansas, the daughter of William C. Moore and Aura Lee Dickey. Her father was the editor of the local newspaper; he would later move to California and edit The Hueneme Harbor Bulletin.

In 1926, she became the first woman to be hired by Universal as a "gagman" (comedy writer). She later worked for Tiffany Pictures. She continued to work steadily throughout the 1930s and 1940s, producing scripts for well-received films like The Sin of Nora Moran, A Shriek in the Night, and In Old California.

She was married to filmmaker Albert Ray until his death. Her date of death and final resting place are unknown.

Selected filmography 

 In Old Sacramento (1946)
 Murder in the Music Hall (1946)
 The Cheaters (1945)
 Someone to Remember (1943)
 In Old California (1942)
 You're Telling Me (1942)
 Girl from Avenue A (1940)
 Free, Blonde and 21 (1940)
 The Cisco Kid and the Lady (1939)
 Charlie Chan in Reno (1939)
 Winner Take All (1939)
 Everybody's Baby (1939)
 Keep Smiling (1938)
 Island in the Sky (1938)
 City Girl (1938)
 45 Fathers (1937)
 Under Your Spell (1936)
 Star for a Night (1936)
 The Crime of Dr. Forbes (1936)
 My Marriage (1936)
 Thunder in the Night (1935)
 Smart Girl (1935)
 Helldorado (1935)
 Money Means Nothing (1934)
 A Woman's Man (1934)
 The Sin of Nora Morgan (1933)
 A Shriek in the Night (1933)
 The Intruder (1933)
 Officer Thirteen (1932)
 Guilty or Not Guilty (1932)
 The Thirteenth Guest (1932)
 Deceit (1932)
 Morals for Women (1931)
 Two Men and a Maid (1929)
 The Voice Within (1929)
 Painted Faces (1929)
 Marriage by Contract (1928)
 The Power of Silence (1928)
 The Grain of Dust (1928)
 The House of Scandal (1928)
 Women's Wares (1927)

References

External links

Screenwriters from Arkansas
1900s births
Year of death missing
American women screenwriters
20th-century American women writers